Astraptes, commonly known as the flasher butterflies, is a genus of skipper butterflies in the subfamily Eudaminae. They are found in the Nearctic and Neotropical ecozones.

Species
The following species are recognised in the genus Astraptes: 
 Astraptes erycina (Plötz, 1881) Brazil
 Astraptes mabillei Steinhauser, 1989 Bolivia
 Astraptes halesius (Hewitson, 1877) French Guiana, Peru
 Astraptes aulus (Plötz, 1881) Panama to Brazil
 Astraptes enotrus (Stoll, [1781]) Guiana, Guyane, Suriname, Colombia, Brazil, Peru, Trinidad
 Astraptes janeira (Schaus, 1902) Brazil, Suriname, Colombia, Paraguay

References

External links 
 Images representing Astraptes at Consortium for the Barcode of Life
 Butterflies of the Americas images

 
Eudaminae
Hesperiidae of South America
Hesperiidae genera
Taxa named by Jacob Hübner